The 2015 French Indoor Athletics Championships was the 44th edition of the national championship in indoor track and field for France, organised by the French Athletics Federation. It was held on 21–22 February at the Jean-Pellez Stadium in Aubière. A total of 28 events (divided evenly between the sexes) were contested over the two-day competition. An indoor 400 metres hurdles was also held as a non-championship demonstration event.

Results

Men

Women

References

Results
 Results. French Athletics Federation  

French Indoor Athletics Championships
French Indoor Athletics Championships
French Indoor Athletics Championships
French Indoor Athletics Championships
Sport in Puy-de-Dôme